Oji "Donoji" Chukwuemeka Ifeanyichukwu (born 28 July 1981) is a Nigerian architect, entrepreneur, author and carpenter known for his carpentry training in Abuja. He is a co-founder and CEO of Dazzle Furniture Limited and currently serves as President, National Carpentry and Furniture Summit (NACAFS). Donoji holds master’s degree in architecture and an MBA in entrepreneurship. In 2021 he wrote and self-published an 83-page book entitled The Solepreneur: Grow your Business Faster and Smater.

Early life and education 
Oji Chukwuemeka Ifeanyichukwu was born on 28 July 1981 in Enugu, Nigeria. He earned bachelor’s and master’s degrees in Architecture from Chukwuemeka Odumegwu Ojukwu University before proceeding to the Institute for Transformative Thought & Learning, Doctoral Research Centre & University (ITTL-DRC) Arizona, USA where he obtained a master’s of business administration (MBA) in Entrepreneurship. Donoji is a member of the Nigerian Institute of Management.

Career 

Donoji began his entrepreneurial career in 2009, when he cofounded Dazzle Furniture Limited with Oji Chukwudimma Chukwudike. Later, they established Dazzle Carpentry Training Limited and went into partnership with Turkish furniture makers to train young Nigerians carpentry. As of 2021, Dazzle Carpentry Training had trained over 300 people. Donoji is the CEO of Dazzle Furniture and Dazzle Training limited. He is a co-founder of Rainermakers Dynamics Solutions LTD, the owners of Kobo Invest.

Donoji is the current President of National Carpentry and Furniture Summit (NACAFS) and serves as the public relations officer of the Interior Designers Association of Nigeria (IDAN) in affiliation with International Federation of Interior Architects and Designers (IFIAD).

References 

Nigerian carpenters
1981 births
Living people
Nigerian architects
Igbo architects
Nigerian furniture makers
Chukwuemeka Odumegwu Ojukwu University alumni
People from Enugu